TV OD is a British comedy satire show that has aired on ITV2 from 5 June until 24 July 2014 and is hosted by Matt Edmondson.

Episode guide

External links

2010s British comedy television series
2014 British television series debuts
2014 British television series endings
ITV comedy
ITV panel games
English-language television shows